Azen may refer to:

 Azen, Missouri, United States
 Azen, Washington County, Virginia, United States
 Azen Gushnasp, Iranian statesman
 Ben-Azen (fl. ca. 1200 BC), Egyptian official

See also
 Asen (disambiguation)